First Civil War may refer to:

 First Civil War (Kazakh Khanate) (1522–1538)
 First War of Religion (1562-1563) in the French Civil Wars of Religion
 First English Civil War (1642–1646)
 First Sudanese Civil War (1955-1972)
 First Liberian Civil War (1989-1996)

See also
 Second Civil War (disambiguation)
 Civil War (disambiguation)